KCBW 104.5 FM is a radio station licensed to Grandin, Missouri.  The station broadcasts a Classic rock format and is owned by Fox Radio Network, LLC.

References

External links
KCBW's website

CBW
Classic rock radio stations in the United States